Diana Holman-Hunt (25 October 1913 – 10 August 1993) was an English memoir writer and art critic.

Holman-Hunt was the granddaughter of painter William Holman Hunt, a founder of the Pre-Raphaelite Brotherhood in 1848. Her first marriage was to Villiers A'Court (Bill) Bergne, and her second to David Cuthbert. Her son Paul Bergne was a leading British expert on Central Asia.

Published books
 My Grandmothers and I (1960) – her unusual childhood with two eccentric grandmothers, both highly stationed in British society.
 My Grandfather, His Wives and Loves (1969) – her grandfather William Holman Hunt.
 Latin Among Lions (1974) – the Chilean painter Álvaro Guevara.

References

External links
 New York Times obituary
 Telegraph obituary (Paul Bergne)

1913 births
1993 deaths
20th-century English memoirists
20th-century English women writers
British women memoirists
English art critics
British women art critics
English women non-fiction writers